C. Leo DeOrsey (died 1965) was a Washington attorney, minority owner of the Washington Redskins, and the agent for the Mercury Seven astronauts.

References

1965 deaths
Lawyers from Washington, D.C.
Washington Redskins owners
Year of birth missing
20th-century American lawyers